The 1995 Finnish Cup was the 41st season of the main annual association football cup competition in Finland. It was organised as a single-elimination knock–out tournament and participation in the competition was voluntary.  The final was held at the Olympic Stadium, Helsinki on 28 October 1995 with MyPa defeating FC Jazz by 1-0 before an attendance of 6,140 spectators.

Early rounds 
Not currently available.

Round 9

Quarter-finals

Semi-finals

Final

References

External links
 Suomen Cup Official site 

Finnish Cup seasons
Finnish Cup, 1995
Finnish Cup, 1995